The 2020–21 SK Rapid Wien season is the 123rd season in club history.

Bundesliga

League table

Regular season

Results summary

Bundesliga fixtures and results

Austrian Cup

Austrian Cup fixtures and results

Champions League

Champions League review
Rapid entered the Champions League in the 2nd qualifying round.

Qualifying rounds

Europa League

Europa League review
Rapid entered the Europa League group stage after being eliminated in the 3rd qualifying round of the Champions League.

Group stage

Table

Fixtures and results

Pre-season and friendlies

Team record

Squad

Squad statistics

Goal scorers

Disciplinary record

Transfers

In

Out

Notes

References

Rapid Wien
SK Rapid Wien seasons